Cerebroside-sulfatase (EC 3.1.6.8, arylsulfatase A, cerebroside sulfate sulfatase) is an enzyme with systematic name cerebroside-3-sulfate 3-sulfohydrolase. This enzyme catalyses the following chemical reaction

 a cerebroside 3-sulfate + H2O  a cerebroside + sulfate

This enzyme hydrolyses galactose-3-sulfate residues in a number of lipids.

See also 
 Arylsulfatase A

References

External links 
 

EC 3.1.6